Transport in Europe provides for the movement needs of over 700 million people and associated freight.

Overview
The political geography of Europe divides the continent into over 50 sovereign states and territories. This fragmentation, along with increased movement of people since the Industrial Revolution, has led to a high level of cooperation between European countries in developing and maintaining transport networks. Supranational and intergovernmental organisations such as the European Union (EU), Council of Europe and the Organization for Security and Co-operation in Europe have led to the development of international standards and agreements that allow people and freight to cross the borders of Europe, largely with unique levels of freedom and ease.

Road, rail, air and water transportation are all prevalent and important across Europe. Europe was the location of the world's first railways and motorways and is now the location of some of the world's busiest ports and airports. The Schengen Area enables border control-free travel between 26 European countries. Freight transportation has a high level of intermodal compatibility and the European Economic Area allows the free movement of goods across 30 states. Of all tonne-kilometres transported in 2016, 51% were by road, 33% by sea, 12% by rail, 4% by inland waterways, and 0.1% by air.

A review of critical success factors for the delivery of transport infrastructure projects in Europe is presented in a 2017 report.

Rail transport

Powered rail transport began in England in the early 19th century with the invention of the speed train. The modern European rail network spans the entire continent and provides movement of passengers and freight. There are significant high-speed rail passenger networks, such as the TGV in France and the LAV in Spain. The Channel Tunnel connects the United Kingdom with France and thus the whole of the European rail system, and it was called one of the seven wonders of the modern world by the American Society of Civil Engineers.

Various method of rail electrification are used as well as much unelectrified track. Standard gauge is widespread in Central and Western Europe, Russian gauge predominates in parts of Eastern Europe, and mainline services on the Iberian Peninsula and the island of Ireland use the rarer Iberian gauge and Irish gauge, respectively. The European Rail Traffic Management System is an EU initiative to create a Europe-wide standard for train signalling.

Rail infrastructure, freight transport and passenger services are provided by a combination of local and national governments and private companies. Passenger ticketing varies from country to country and service to service. The Eurail Pass, a rail pass for 18 European countries, is available only for persons who do not live in Europe, Morocco, Algeria or Tunisia. Inter Rail passes allow multi-journey travel around Europe for people living in Europe and surrounding countries.

Rapid transit 

Many cities across Europe have a rapid transit system, commonly referred to as a metro, which is an electric railway. The world's first underground railway, the Metropolitan Railway, was opened in London in 1863. It is now part of London's rapid transit system that referred to as the London Underground, the longest such system in Europe. After London, the largest European metro systems by track length are in Moscow, Madrid and Paris.

Coach transport
In the early 2010s, many countries in Europe decided to liberalize the market for medium/long distance coach (intercity bus) transportation, obliged to do it by the EC directive 1370/2007 (Public Service Obligations in Transport). This move has already proven to be helping both the economies and the Europeans.

The bus is the cheapest method of transportation and slower than the train in countries that have high-speed rail. However, many companies have made adjustments so that their coach fleets can be as comfortable as trains. Toilets and power have been added to the coaches, and some are equipped with WiFi.

Air transport

Despite an extensive road and rail network, 43% of international travel within the EU was by air in 2013. Air travel is particularly important for peripheral nations such as Spain and Greece and island nations such as Malta and Cyprus, where a large majority of border crossings are by air. A large tourism industry also attracts many visitors to Europe, most of whom arrive into one of Europe's many large international airports – major hubs include London Heathrow, Istanbul, Paris-Charles De Gaulle, Frankfurt and Amsterdam Schiphol. The advent of low cost carriers in recent years has led to a large increase in air travel within Europe. Air transportation is now often the cheapest way of travelling between cities. This increase in air travel has led to problems of airspace overcrowding and environmental concerns. The Single European Sky is one initiative aimed at solving these problems.

Within the European Union, the complete freedoms of the air and the world's most extensive cabotage agreements allow budget airlines to operate freely across the EU. Cheap air travel is spurred on by the trend for regional airports levying low fees to market themselves as serving large cities quite far away. Ryanair is especially noted for this, since it primarily flies out of regional airports up to 150 kilometres away from the cities they are said to serve. A primary example of this is the Weeze-Skavsta flight, where Weeze mainly serves the Nijmegen/Kleve area, while Skavsta serves Nyköping/Oxelösund. Ryanair however, markets this flight as Düsseldorf-Stockholm, which are both 80–90 kilometres away from these airports, resulting in up to four hours of ground transportation just to get to and from the airport.

Sea and river transport 

The Port of Rotterdam, Netherlands is the largest port in Europe and one of the busiest ports in the world, handling some 440 million metric tons of cargo in 2013. When the associated Europoort industrial area is included, Rotterdam is by certain measurements the world's busiest port. Two thirds of all inland water freight shipping within the E.U., and 40% of containers, pass through the Netherlands. Other large ports are the Port of Hamburg in Germany and the Port of Antwerp in Belgium. They are all a part of the so-called "Northern Range".

The English Channel is one of the world's busiest seaways carrying over 400 ships per day between Europe's North Sea and Baltic Sea ports and the rest of the world.

As well as its role in freight movement, sea transport is an important part of Europe's energy supply. Europe is one of the world's major oil tanker discharge destinations. Energy is also supplied to Europe by sea in the form of LNG. The South Hook LNG terminal at Milford Haven, Wales is Europe's largest LNG terminal.

See also
 Transport in the European Union
 Directorate-General for Energy and Transport
 Emission standard
 Energy in the European Union
 Environment in the European Union
 European Aviation Safety Agency
 European Car of the Year
 European Climate Change Programme
 European Common Aviation Area
 European Federation for Transport and Environment
 European Organisation for the Safety of Air Navigation (EUROCONTROL)
 European vehicle registration plates
 International E-road network
 Momo car-sharing
 Roadex Project
 Trans-European Networks
 UNECE vehicle standards.
 Jacques Barrot, Vice-President of the European Commission, in charge of transport.
 ACP Rail International
 Southeast Europe Transport Community

References

External links
Common Transport Policy and European transport,  European Commission.
Eurostat – Statistics Explained – all articles on transport
Worldwide official website for Eurail Passes (non-European).
Worldwide official website for InterRail Passes (European).
Railways in Europe (with emphasis on interoperability and border crossings)
European waterways
Rail Choice, UK provider of a vast number of different railpasses covering Europe, the United States, Japan and Australasia.
 Transport & Mobility Leuven.
 Trains Europe, An exciting, economic and flexible way to explore Europe.
 Rail Europe Official site, US distributor of the European Railroads.
 Britain On Track Official BritRail Pass site, US and Canadian supplier of BritRail and Eurail Passes.
 ACP Rail International Official site, Offers Eurail passes, BritRail, Amtrak, Japan Rail, Australia rail passes and more.
 Europa Trenes.
 The public transport guide, European public transport overview
 Mapofeurope.com, Information on travelling through Europe
  Europe Travel Guide, dedicated to all aspects of traveling throughout the 55 European nations
 

 
Economy of Europe